Henning Gravrok (born 19 March 1948 in Tovik, Northern Norway) is a Norwegian jazz musician (saxophone) and music teacher, raised in Harstad and educated as teacher. Since 1975 he has been central to the Tromsø and Bodø jazz scenes.

Career 
In Tromsø, he played in the bands "Hei og Hå" (1975–79) and "Heracleum" (1976–78), "Inge Kolsvik Quartet" (1979–80), "Fusion Band" (1980–81), "Kjell Svendsen Quintet" (1981–83), "Øystein Norvoll Quintet" and "Synk" (1983–84). In recent years he has taken part in the Northern Norwegian band "Bossa Nordpå", and participated in Marit Sandvik Band.

His debut recording was as a member of Thorgeir Stubø Quintet (1981). In Bodø he led "Bodø Big Band" for a period and the "Ad Lib Jazzklubb", Gravrok has written Minner om i morgen (1991) which was awarded "Stubøprisen" (1991). With his own Henning Gravrok Band he released Hyss (1996) and Ord (1999), with lyrics by Rolf Jacobsen. His latest release was Sense (2006), in cooperation with Eivind Valnes (piano), Rune Nergård (bass), Børge Petersen-Øverleir (guitar) and Andreas Håkestad (drums).

As a composer he has contributed work to "Festspillene i Nord-Norge" (1980, 1989) and the 175th Anniversary to Bodø (1991), and composed music to the novel series "Peder Seier" by Ole Rølvåg, set up on Nordland Teater (2006). He is also Associate Professor at the Conservatory of Music at the University of Tromsø.

Honors 
"Stubøprisen" 1991
"Nordlysprisen" 1998
"Bodø bys kulturpris" 2003.

Discography

Solo albums 
1996: Hyss (Euridice)
1999: Ord med tekster av Rolf Jacobsen (Tylden)
2006: Sense (Turn Left Productions)
2010: Q

Collaborative works 
Within Thorgeir Stubø Band
1981: Notice  (Odin Records)

With Halvdan Sivertsen
1984: Labbetussviser  (Igloo Records)
1985: Amerika  (Plateselskapet A/S)
1990: Førr Ei Dame  (Plateselskapet A/S)
1991: Hilsen Halvdan  (Plateselskapet A/S)
1996: Ny & Naken  (Norske Gram)

Within Torgils
1997: Tellus. The Blue Album (White Mountain Records)
2001: Lysbroen (White Mountain Records)
2004: Lånte Fjær (White Mountain Records)

With other projects
1998: Something For Me (Micro Booking), within Ripcoy
2002: Even Then (Mother Song) (Taurus Records), within Marit Sandvik Band
2005: Med Solidarisk Hilsen (Frank A. Jenssen Records), with Kjell A. Andreassen and Frank A. Jenssen

References

External links 

Avant-garde jazz musicians
Norwegian jazz saxophonists
Norwegian jazz composers
Musicians from Harstad
1948 births
Living people
21st-century saxophonists